Kilmer may refer to:

People
 Kilmer (Marvel Comics), cartoon character, a Neo superhuman
 Billy Kilmer (born 1939), American former football player, coach, and commissioner
 Derek Kilmer (born 1974), American politician from Washington State
 Ethan Kilmer (born 1983), American former football player
 Frederick Barnett Kilmer (1851–1934), American pharmacist, author, public health activist and director
 Joanne Whalley-Kilmer (born 1961), British television and film actress
 John E. Kilmer (1930–1952), U.S. Navy Medal of Honor recipient
 Josh Kilmer-Purcell (born 1969), American writer, businessperson, and television personality
 Joyce Kilmer (1886–1918), American poet, teacher and soldier killed in World War I
 Misha Kilmer, American mathematician who received her PhD in 1997
 Val Kilmer (born 1959), American stage, film and television actor
 Willis Sharpe Kilmer (1869–1940), American patent medicine manufacturer, newspaperman, horse breeder, and entrepreneur

Other
 Camp Kilmer, U.S. military facility in New Jersey
 Joyce Kilmer Middle School, Vienna, Virginia

See also
 Douglas Killmer (1947–2005), American bass guitarist whose name is commonly misspelled Kilmer